Lassiter High School is a public high school located north of Atlanta in Marietta, Georgia, United States, in the Cobb County School District. The school was founded in 1981. The school colors are gold and maroon, and the school mascot is the Faceless Trojan.

History 

Lassiter High School was established in 1981.  It was awarded the Georgia Public School of Excellence award in 1992, 1999, 2008, and 2010. In 2000, it was named a National Blue Ribbon School of Excellence.

The school was named for Leamond N. Lassiter, who was a member of the Cobb County Board of Education for 12 years.

Demographics
The demographic breakdown of the 1,945 students enrolled in 2021–2022 was:
Male - 49.6%
Female - 50.4%
Native American/Alaskan - 0.2%
Asian/Pacific islanders - 7.7%
Black - 7.7%
Hispanic - 10.3%
White - 68.5%
Multiracial - 5.6%

2.8% of the students were eligible for free or reduced lunch.

Sports and clubs 
The school's first team state championship was in girls' cross country, won in fall 1982. More recently, the baseball team has been the state runner-up seven times in their nine appearances in the state finals. The boys' soccer team was ranked first in the nation during the beginning of the spring season.

Music 
The Lassiter Marching Trojan Band won the Bands of America Grand National Championships in 1998 and 2002. The marching band took part in the Macy's Thanksgiving Day Parade in 1999, 2004, and 2010. The marching band also took part in the Rose Parade in Pasadena, California on New Year's Day in 1988, 2001, 2005, 2013, and 2019.  The Band is a 2-time recipient of the John Philip Sousa Foundation's Sudler Flag of Honor in 1988 and 1998.

In 2020, Orchestra Director Carol Doemel sparked controversy with a Facebook post disparaging Jacob Blake.

Sports 

Baseball (1999 & 2006 State Champions)
Basketball
Cheerleading (1996 AAAA State Champions)
Cross Country (State Championships: boys' 1988; girls' 82, 83, 84, 86, 87, 93)
Equestrian
Fastpitch softball (State Champions 2007)
Fencing (club sport)
Football 
Golf (girls' State Champions 2001)
Gymnastics (girls')  (2010 State Champions)
Lacrosse (2004 Co-State Champions, 2006 State Champions, 2017 Boys State Champions)
Soccer (boys' State Champions 1996 and 2022, girls State Champions 2016 and 2022)
Swimming (2008, 2009, 2010, 2011 State Champions, girls')
Roller hockey(club sport) (2002 State Champions, 2007 State Champions)
Rugby union (club sport) (State Champions 2005, 2007, 2008 and 2011)
Tennis (1996 girls' State Champions, 2005 boys' State Champions)
Track & field (girls' 2010 State Champions)
Volleyball 
Wrestling

Notable alumni 

 Mark Bloom - MLS soccer player
 AJ Bowen - actor
Kerry Brown (American football) - former Washington Redskins OL and Left Guard
Viet Cuong (composer)
Andy Dick - Comedian, Actor, Musician
Hanno Dirksen - South African rugby player
 Amy Dumas - professional wrestler and musician best known as Lita
Bruce Elder (basketball) - former all-SEC forward at Vanderbilt University
 Kelly Flinn - first female B-52 pilot in the US Air Force
 Bryan Lundquist - swimmer, world record holder in 4 × 100 m freestyle
 Philip Lutzenkirchen - former college football player for Auburn University and NFL player for the St. Louis Rams
 Hutson Mason - former college football player for the University of Georgia
 Melanie Moore - professional dancer
 Kyle Patrick - lead singer of The Click Five
 April Richardson - comedian, regular on Chelsea Lately; frequent contestant on @midnight 
 Cody Runnels - professional wrestler under the name Cody Rhodes
Stephen Sklenka - United States Marine Corps Lieutenant General and current Deputy Commander, United States Indo-Pacific Command
 Lawson Vaughn - MLS professional soccer player
 Stefani Robinson - television writer, most notably for Atlanta; Emmy nominee

References

External links 
 

Schools in Cobb County, Georgia
Public high schools in Georgia (U.S. state)
Educational institutions established in 1981
School buildings completed in 1981
1981 establishments in Georgia (U.S. state)